Scenes from the Second Storey is the debut album by American rock band the God Machine, released in 1993 by Fiction Records and Polydor. It peaked at number 55 on the UK Albums Chart.

The album opens with a sample from the film adaptation of The Sheltering Sky (the same sample also opens Neurosis' Enemy of the Sun, an album released in the same year as Scenes from the Second Storey), while the single "Home" contains an intro consisting of the beginning of the track "Pilentze Pee" by the Bulgarian State Television Female Vocal Choir from the album Le Mystère des Voix Bulgares. "Home" peaked at number 65 on the UK Singles Chart in January 1993.

Critical reception

In 2005, Scenes from the Second Storey was ranked number 312 in Rock Hard magazine's book The 500 Greatest Rock & Metal Albums of All Time.

Legacy
In 2010, as a homage to Scenes from the Second Storey, Morrigan Books published an anthology of horror short stories by Australian authors, written and titled in the same order as the album's track listing. The authors included David Conyers, Stephen Dedman, Paul Haines, Robert Hood, Cat Sparks, Andrew J McKiernan and Kaaron Warren.

Track listing

Released as CD and double LP. A double CD version including the Home EP was released in the US.

Credits
 Produced by the God Machine
 Engineered by Kenny Jones
 Recorded at Blackwing, Maison Rouge and Matrix Studios, London except "The Piano Song" and "It's All Over" recorded at Joe's Garage with Roger Askew, and "Temptation" as a live improvisation recorded in Room 3
 All songs mixed by Kenny Jones at Matrix Studios
 Mastered by Kevin Metcalfe at The Townhouse
 Chant on "The Desert Song" by Katharine Gifford
 Programming by Andy Montgomery
 Preacher provided by the Hurting Choice
 Vocal on "Home" by the Voix de Bulgares 
 Clarinet on "Seven" by Ian Bishop
 "Purity" recorded acoustically with Christiane Van Der Lee on cello, Anthony Pleeth on cello, Gavyn Wright on viola and Neil Filby on violin
 String arrangements by Robin Proper-Sheppard; conducted by Nick Ingman
 All other atmospheric nuances and nuisances created by The God Machine and Kenny Jones
 The God Machine is Robin Proper-Sheppard (vocals/guitar), Ron Austin (drums/piano) and Jimmy Fernandez (bass)
 All words by Proper-Sheppard, all music by Austin/Fernandez/Proper-Sheppard
 Published by Fiction Songs Ltd.

Charts

References

1993 albums
The God Machine (band) albums
Fiction Records albums